Xanthorrhoea acaulis is a species of grasstree native to New South Wales, Australia.

Description
X. acaulis generally has no trunk, or rarely one up to 30 cm in height, though it branches below ground and may have multiple crowns. The greyish to bluish-green leaves are about 1.8 mm wide and 1 mm thick. The scape is 25–45 cm long and 8–12 mm in diameter. The flower spike is 0.2–0.75 times as long as the scape, 10–25 cm long and 2.5–3.4 cm in diameter.

Distribution and habitat
This grasstree occurs in New South Wales west of the Great Dividing Range, between Narrabri and Pilliga in the north and Grenfell in the south, mainly on sandy soils in dry sclerophyll forest.

References

 

Asparagales of Australia
acaulis
Flora of New South Wales
Plants described in 1972